Patrick Drew (February 21, 1832November 1, 1903) was an Irish American immigrant, construction contractor, and Democratic politician.  He served three terms in the Wisconsin State Assembly, representing the city of Milwaukee.

Biography
Drew was born in County Limerick, Ireland, sources have differed on the date. In 1854, he settled in Milwaukee, Wisconsin. He died in 1903 and was buried at Calvary Cemetery.

Career
Drew was a member of the Assembly during the 1868, 1869 and 1876 sessions. Previously, he had been a member of the school board of Milwaukee from 1863 to 1865 and of the board of supervisors of Milwaukee County in 1863. Drew was later Commissioner of Public Works for Milwaukee's east side from 1893 to 1896. He was a Democrat.

References

Politicians from County Limerick
Irish emigrants to the United States (before 1923)
Politicians from Milwaukee
Democratic Party members of the Wisconsin State Assembly
County supervisors in Wisconsin
School board members in Wisconsin
1832 births
1903 deaths
Burials in Wisconsin